Brendan Crinion (11 November 1923 – 2 July 1989) was an Irish Fianna Fáil politician who served for more than twenty years as a Teachta Dála (TD) and as a Senator.

A farmer before entering politics, Crinion was first elected to Dáil Éireann as a Fianna Fáil TD for the Kildare constituency at the 1961 general election. He was returned for Kildare at the 1965 general election, but after boundary changes for the 1969 general election he stood in the neighbouring Meath constituency. He was defeated there, but was then nominated by the Taoiseach, Jack Lynch, to the 12th Seanad.

At the next general election in 1973, he stood again in Meath, unseating the long-serving Fianna Fáil TD Michael Hilliard. Crinion was re-elected in Meath at the 1977 general election and again in 1981 general election, before retiring from politics at the February 1982 general election.

References

1923 births
1989 deaths
Fianna Fáil TDs
Members of the 17th Dáil
Members of the 18th Dáil
Members of the 12th Seanad
Members of the 20th Dáil
Members of the 21st Dáil
Members of the 22nd Dáil
Irish farmers
Nominated members of Seanad Éireann
Fianna Fáil senators